Lina Andrijauskaitė (born 29 May 1987) is a track and field various events athlete who competes internationally for Lithuania.

In 2010, she represented Lithuania in 2010 European Athletics Championships.

References
 

1987 births
Living people
Lithuanian female long jumpers
Lithuanian female sprinters